Gyranthera darienensis, the cucarrón or cucharón, is a species of flowering plant in the Malvaceae sensu lato or family Bombacaceae. It is found only in Panama. It is threatened by habitat loss.

References

Malvaceae 
Flora of Panama
Endangered plants
Taxonomy articles created by Polbot